Bliss is the second studio album by American singer and songwriter Donna de Lory, released in 2000 by Secret Road Music Services. "On and On" was released as the album's only single; a remixes EP for the song was distributed in 2000, prompting it to reach #17 on the Dance Club Songs chart in the United States. "Where I've Never Been" was released as a promotional CD in 2001.

Track listing

References 

2000 albums
Donna De Lory albums